Bziniczka is a river of Poland, It is a right tributary of the Mała Panew near Kolonowskie.

Rivers of Poland
Rivers of Silesian Voivodeship
Rivers of Opole Voivodeship